Anil Nandy (1923 – 14 February 2003) was a former Indian football player. He was part of the team that played for India at the 1948 Summer Olympics. He with his brothers Nikhil Nandy and Santosh Nandy  are the only three brothers to have played for India.

Nandy made his debut for India in the international tour to Australia against the Australian football team in 1938.

References

External links
 Anil Nandy at Olympedia

Indian footballers
India international footballers
Footballers from Kolkata
Olympic footballers of India
Footballers at the 1948 Summer Olympics
1923 births
2003 deaths
Association football midfielders
Calcutta Football League players